This is a list of events related to British television in 1933.

Events
21 April – The first television revue, Looking In, is shown on the BBC. The first four minutes of this programme survive on a Silvatone record, an early method of home video recording.
September – BBC Television Policy, Rumours and Facts is published.

Births
 12 January – Michael Aspel, journalist and television presenter
 15 January – Frank Bough, journalist and television presenter (died 2020)
 18 January – David Bellamy, botanist, author, broadcaster and environmental campaigner (died 2019)
 6 February – Leslie Crowther, television comedian and game show host (died 1996)
 22 February – Sheila Hancock, actress
 11 April – Derek Martin, actor
 16 April – Joan Bakewell, broadcaster
 24 April – Claire Davenport, actress (died 2002)
 30 April – Dickie Davies, television presenter
 14 May – Siân Phillips, actress
 23 May – Joan Collins, actress
 2 August – Tom Bell, actor (died 2006)
 21 August – Barry Norman, film critic (died 2017)
 25 September – Eric Chappell, sitcom writer (died 2022)
 30 September – Barbara Knox, actress
 10 October – Daniel Massey, actor (died 1998)
 3 November – Jeremy Brett, actor (died 1995)
 22 December – Richard Whitmore, newsreader

See also
 1933 in British music
 1933 in the United Kingdom
 List of British films of 1933

References